Stewartville is an unincorporated community in Lauderdale County, Alabama, United States.

References

Unincorporated communities in Lauderdale County, Alabama
Unincorporated communities in Alabama